Snowpatch Spire is a mountain peak in British Columbia, Canada. With its first ascent in 1940, it was the last of the Bugaboo Spires to be climbed. It is located southwest of the Conrad Kain hut, between Bugaboo, Vowell and Crescent Glaciers, at the south end of Bugaboo Provincial Park. The mountain's toponym was officially adopted October 29, 1962, by the Geographical Names Board of Canada.

Climate
Based on the Köppen climate classification, Snowpatch Spire is located in a subarctic climate zone with cold, snowy winters, and mild summers. Winter temperatures can drop below −20 °C with wind chill factors below −30 °C.

Routes
Climbing routes on Snowpatch Spire:
 Wildflowers - 
 Kraus-McCarthy - class 5.9
 Sunshine - class 5.11
 Surf's Up (aka Southwest Ridge) - class 5.9 
 Southeast Corner (aka Snowpatch Route) - class 5.8

Gallery

References

External links
 
 Snowpatch Spire weather: Mountain-forecast.com

Columbia Valley
Three-thousanders of British Columbia
Purcell Mountains
Kootenay Land District